Belarusian Premier League Reserves Championship is an annual competition for the reserve teams of Belarusian Premier League clubs.
Current: 2020 Belarusian Premier League Reserves Championship

History
The competition was established in 2001. Prior to 2001, most of Belarusian Premier League clubs had their reserve teams or affiliated farm clubs playing in lower divisions of Belarus football league system. After the reserve league creation, all Premier League clubs created the new reserve teams to participate in it, and most of old reserve teams were folded, either immediately or in next several years. Several Premier League clubs with developed youth system still continue running separate farm clubs in the First or Second League. As of 2014, only one such team (Vitebsk-2) is active.

Format
The format of each season of the league is virtually identical to that of respective Premier League season. There is no promotion or relegation depending on the season's final table. Instead, only the reserve teams of current Premier League members are admitted for each season. Match schedule of each season follows closely the calendar of Premier League, except all games are played one day earlier than seniors' game.

Belarusian Reserves Cup
For the 2013 and 2014 seasons, the Premier League format included two phases: 12 teams in a double round-robin league followed by a Championship playoff group and Relegation playoff group. The same groups were used for the Reserves Cup tournament. Winners of both groups played a final game at the end of the season.

Winners

Cup Finals

External links
 Belarusian Football Federation
 Reserve League at kick-off.by
 Reserve League at football.by

 
Reserve football leagues in Europe
reserves
Football leagues in Belarus
Sports leagues established in 2001
2001 establishments in Belarus